Fomm is a surname. Notable people with the surname include: 

 Joana Fomm (born 1939), Brazilian actress
 Klara-Hermine Fomm (born 1999), German curler

See also
 Fromm